San Francisco de Asís is one of seven districts of the province Lauricocha in Peru.

References